Agus Suparmanto is an Indonesian politician. He served as Minister of Trade in the 41st Cabinet of Indonesia from 23 October 2019 to 23 December 2020. He is affiliated with the National Awakening Party.

References 

Living people
Year of birth missing (living people)
Place of birth missing (living people)
21st-century Indonesian politicians
Onward Indonesia Cabinet
Trade ministers of Indonesia
National Awakening Party politicians